This is the discography of Canadian Idol first season winner and Low Level Flight vocalist Ryan Malcolm. In his career, Ryan has released one solo studio album, one solo single, two LLF album, and three LLF singles. He also starred in four music videos.

Albums

Singles

Low Level Flight discography

Albums

Singles

Music videos

References

External links
Low Level Flight official website
Low Level Flight Myspace profile

Discographies of Canadian artists